Christian Thers Nørgaard (born 10 March 1994) is a Danish professional footballer who plays as a defensive midfielder for  club Brentford and the Denmark national team.

Between abortive spells with Hamburger SV and Fiorentina, Nørgaard came to prominence in his homeland with Brøndby. He transferred to Brentford in 2019 and in 2021 was part of the squad which won promotion to the top-flight of English football for the second time in the club's history. Nørgaard was part of the Denmark squads at Euro 2020 and the 2022 World Cup.

Club career

Early years
A defensive midfielder, Nørgaard began his career in his native Denmark with BK Heimdal and Espergærde IF, before entering the youth system at Lyngby in 2008. He progressed to win three calls into the first team squad during the 2011–12 season and made his only senior appearance for the club as a substitute in a 2–2 Superliga draw with HB Køge on 20 November 2011. Two months later, Nørgaard spurned interest from A.C. Milan and TSG 1899 Hoffenheim to transfer to Bundesliga club Hamburger SV for a €400,000 fee. He signed a -year contract, but was unable to settle at the club and failed to make any first team appearances before his departure in August 2013. He gained his first regular experience of senior football with 22 appearances for the reserve team.

Brøndby IF
On 21 August 2013, it was announced that Nørgaard had joined Danish Superliga club Brøndby on a four-year contract. Following a difficult first three seasons with the club, he thereafter was a regular fixture in the team under incoming manager Alexander Zorniger and signed a new -year contract in January 2017. Nørgaard was named as Brøndby's Player of the Year for the 2017 calendar year and won the first silverware of his career with the 2017–18 Danish Cup. Nørgaard became a cult hero at the club and by the time of his departure in July 2018, he had made 145 appearances and scored 11 goals.

Fiorentina
On 19 July 2018, Nørgaard moved to Italy to sign for Serie A club Fiorentina for a fee of approximately €3.5 million. He signed a four-year contract, but made just six appearances before departing the club in May 2019.

Brentford
On 28 May 2019, Nørgaard moved to England to join Brentford on a four-year contract, with the option of an additional year, for an undisclosed fee, reported to be £2.8 million. The move reunited him with his former Denmark youth and Brøndby head coach Thomas Frank. Used as a screening midfielder in front of the defence, Nørgaard made 45 appearances during the 2019–20 season, which ended with defeat in the 2020 Championship play-off Final. In September 2020, he signed a new four-year contract, with the option of a further year.

Nørgaard began the 2020–21 season as a virtual ever-present in midfield and winning senior international recognition with Denmark, but an ankle injury suffered during a match versus Preston North End on 4 October 2020 prevented him from making only one appearance during the following four months. Nørgaard returned to the team in late February 2021 and late in the season he was deployed as the sweeper in a 3-5-2 formation. An injury restricted Nørgaard to only one appearance during Brentford's 2021 playoff campaign, which culminated in promotion to the Premier League after a 2–0 victory over Swansea City in the Final. He finished the season with 22 appearances and one goal, scored in a 2–0 EFL Cup second round win over Southampton early in the campaign.

Nørgaard scored his second Brentford career goal on the opening day of the 2021–22 season, in a 2–0 win over Arsenal. He continued as a virtual ever-present in Premier League matches and in late December 2021, he signed a new -year contract, with a one-year option. Nørgaard's performances were recognised with the club's Supporters' and Players' Player of the Year awards. He ended the 2021–22 season with 38 appearances, three goals and having attempted the most tackles of any Premier League player.

Due to a knee problem suffered prior to Brentford's final match of the 2021–22 season, Nørgaard missed much of Brentford's 2022–23 pre-season, though he participated in the club's training camp. He returned to match play for the final friendly of pre-season on 30 July 2022. Following four appearances and one goal during the opening month of the regular season, Nørgaard was withdrawn in order to recover from an ongoing achilles problem, which did not require surgery. He returned to match play in early November and made two appearances prior to the World Cup break. Still struggling with the achillles following the World Cup, Nørgaard elected to play through the pain and hope that the issue resolved itself, which was successful. He also captained the team in the absence of the injured Pontus Jansson.

International career
Nørgaard won 73 caps and scored five goals for Denmark between U16 and U21 level. He was a part of the Danes' 2011 U17 World Cup and 2015 and 2017 European U21 Championship squads.

Nørgaard an unused substitute for the senior team during four 2018–19 Nations League group stage and Euro 2020 qualifying matches in 2018 and 2019. On 8 September 2020, Nørgaard made his debut for the senior team with a start in a 0–0 Nations League draw with England and his performance was recognised with the DBU's man of the match award. After winning three further caps during the 2020–21 season, Nørgaard was named in the Denmark squad for Euro 2020 and appeared as a substitute in five of the six matches of the Danes' run to the semi-final. Nørgaard was named in Denmark's 2022 World Cup squad and made one substitute appearance prior to the team's group stage exit.

Style of play 
Nørgaard has been described as "technically good and looks to pass the ball forward. Importantly, he is also good at intercepting passes and has a strong defensive mindset". He "can play in a variety of different positions in the midfield, but has given his best performances as a deep midfield player".

Personal life 
Nørgaard was born in Copenhagen and grew up in Espergærde from the age of five. He is married with a son.

Career statistics

Club

International 

Scores and results list Denmark's goal tally first, score column indicates score after each Nørgaard goal.

Honours
Brøndby
Danish Cup: 2017–18

Brentford
EFL Championship play-offs: 2021

Individual
Brøndby Player of the Year: 2017
Brentford Supporters' Player of the Year: 2021–22
Brentford Players' Player of the Year: 2021–22

References

External links

Christian Nørgaard at brentfordfc.com

1994 births
Living people
Footballers from Copenhagen
Association football midfielders
Danish men's footballers
Denmark youth international footballers
Denmark under-21 international footballers
Denmark international footballers
Lyngby Boldklub players
Hamburger SV players
Brøndby IF players
ACF Fiorentina players
Brentford F.C. players
Danish Superliga players
Regionalliga players
Serie A players
English Football League players
UEFA Euro 2020 players
Danish expatriate men's footballers
Expatriate footballers in England
Expatriate footballers in Germany
Expatriate footballers in Italy
Danish expatriate sportspeople in England
Danish expatriate sportspeople in Germany
Danish expatriate sportspeople in Italy
Premier League players
2022 FIFA World Cup players